The person Lloyd Free may refer to:
 Lloyd A. Free, American pollster, or
 World B. Free, American basketball player.